Achilleas Poungouras (Greek: Αχιλλέας Πούγγουρας; born 13 December 1995) is a Greek professional footballer who plays as a centre-back for Super League club Panathinaikos.

Career
Born in Thessaloniki, Poungouras began his career with hometown club PAOK, progressing through the organisation’s youth system to eventually break into the first team in the 2014–15 season. However, he failed to hold down a spot in the senior roster, subsequently sent on loan to Veria and to Polish club Arka Gdynia. On 10 February 2017, Poungouras extended his contract with PAOK until 2019.

On 25 July 2018, Panathinaikos bolstered their defensive options, signing him with a three-year contract through to 2021. Poungouras moved to Panathinaikos as a free agent from PAOK, who kept a resale rate of 40%. His second season (2019–20 season) at the club has been a more enjoyable and successful one. He has formed a great pairing with Bart Schenkeveld, as they complement each other so well. The young Greek defender overtook João Nunes and Dimitris Kolovetsios in the pecking order and has his strong performances are being tracked by Greek national coach John van 't Schip.

On 29 June 2020, Panathinaikos officially announced the extension of his contract, until the summer of 2023.  On 3 March 2021, Pougouras scored his first professional goal with a header in the home defeat of Panathinaikos by PAS Giannina, losing the qualification to the semifinals of the Greek Cup.

Career statistics

Club

Honours
PAOK
Greek Cup: 2016–17, 2017–18

Panathinaikos
Greek Cup: 2021–22

References

External links

1995 births
Living people
Greek footballers
Greece under-21 international footballers
Greece youth international footballers
Greek expatriate footballers
Super League Greece players
Ekstraklasa players
PAOK FC players
Veria F.C. players
Arka Gdynia players
Panathinaikos F.C. players
Greek expatriate sportspeople in Poland
Expatriate footballers in Poland
Association football defenders
Footballers from Thessaloniki